Euonymus castaneifolius is a tree in the family Celastraceae. The specific epithet  is from the Latin meaning "chestnut-coloured leaves".

Description
The smooth bark is grey-brown. The flowers are white.

Distribution and habitat
Euonymus castaneifolius grows naturally in Sumatra and Borneo. Its habitat is lowland mixed dipterocarp to montane forests from sea-level to  altitude.

References

castaneifolius
Trees of Sumatra
Trees of Borneo
Plants described in 1931